Guillermo Dietrich (born March 5, 1969) is an Argentine economist and politician. He served as the Minister of Transport of Argentina in the Mauricio Macri cabinet from 2015–2019.

Life and education

Guillermo Dietrich was born in Buenos Aires, Argentina of German descent. He received a degree in economics from the Pontifical Catholic University of Argentina in 1993 with a postgraduate degree in negotiation and an MBA magna cum laude from the IAE Business School of Austral University.

He led the Dietrich Company, an automotive retailer founded by his father, Guillermo Dietrich Sr. in 1964. undertook various businesses related to the automotive industry and technology.

Politics

He is founder and leader of G25 along with Esteban Bullrich, of the Republican Proposal (PRO) created in 2008 and is a member of the board of directors of Fundación Pensar belonging to PRO.

In 2009 he was named head of Transport and Transit by Mayor Mauricio Macri, where he developed the Metrobús system of lanes for collectives suspected and investigated for surcharges.

At the end of November 2015, Mauricio Macri, as President-elect of Argentina, appointed him to head the Ministry of Transport.

Ministry of Transport
He promoted the "Revolution of the airplanes": the takeoff of the low cost market, the modernization of airports and connections were added. Therefore, 2018 was the best year in history for flights with 29.1 million passengers.

In 2017 the Rosario Metrobus was inaugurated, becoming the first metrobus in the interior of the country.

During its management the underground of the Sarmiento Railroad was reactivated, with the participation of Odebrecht and IECSA.

Personal life

He is married to Javiera Álvarez Echagüe and is the father of two children.

References

External links 
 Guillermo Dietrich, Ministro de Transporte

Transport ministers of Argentina
Argentine people of German descent
Republican Proposal politicians
Pontifical Catholic University of Argentina alumni
Living people
1969 births